Hydrangea zhewanensis is a species of flowering plant in the family Hydrangeaceae, native to China.

External links
 Hydrangea zhewanensis at efloras.org.

zhewanensis
Flora of China